Adani Group is an Indian multinational conglomerate, headquartered in Ahmedabad. It was founded by Gautam Adani in 1988 as a commodity trading business, with the flagship company Adani Enterprises. The Group's diverse businesses include port management, electric power generation and transmission, renewable energy, mining, airport operations, natural gas, food processing and infrastructure. 

In April 2021, Adani Group crossed US$100 billion in market capitalization, and in April 2022 it crossed the $200 billion mark, in both cases becoming the third Indian conglomerate to do so, after Tata Group and Reliance Industries. In November 2022, it reached $280 billion (INR 24 trillion) surpassing Tata Group. Adani subsequently lost more than $104 billion of market capitalization after fraud and market manipulation allegations by short-seller firm Hindenburg Research. The Adani Group has also attracted other controversies due to various reports of irregular practices. More than 60 percent of the Adani Group's revenue is derived from coal-related businesses. The company's corporate debt totaled $30 billion in 2022.

History 
Adani Exports Limited started as a commodity trading company in 1988 and expanded into importing and exporting multiple commodities. With a capital of ₹5 lakhs, the company was established as a partnership firm with the flagship company Adani Enterprises, previously Adani Exports.
In 1990, the Adani Group developed its own port in Mundra to provide a base for its trading operations. It began construction at Mundra in 1995. In 1998, it became the top net foreign exchange earner for India Inc. The company began coal trading in 1999, followed by a joint venture in edible oil refining in 2000 with the formation of Adani Wilmar.

Adani handled 4 Mt of cargo at Mundra in 2002, becoming the largest private port in India. Later in 2006, the company became the largest coal importer in India with 11 Mt of coal handling.
The company expanded its business in 2008, purchasing Bunyu Mine in Indonesia which has 180 Mt of coal reserves. In 2009 the firm began generating 330 MW of thermal power. It also built an edible oil refining capacity in India of 2.2 Mt per annum.

The Adani group became India's largest private coal mining company after Adani Enterprises won the Orissa mine rights in 2010. Operations at the Port of Dahej commenced in 2011 and its capacity subsequently grew to 20 Mt. The company also bought Galilee Basin mine in Australia with 10.4 gigatonnes (Gt) of coal reserves. It also commissioned 60 Mt of handling capacity for the coal import terminal in Mundra, making it the world's largest. 

In 2011, the Adani group also bought Abbot Point port in Australia with 50 Mt of handling capacity. It commissioned India's largest solar power plant with a capacity 40 MW. As the firm achieved 3,960 MW capacity, it became the largest private sector thermal power producer in India. In 2012 The company shifted its focus on three business clusters – resources, logistics and energy.
 
Adani Power emerged as India's largest private power producer in 2014. Adani Power's total installed capacity then stood at 9,280 MW. Dhamra Port was a 50:50 joint venture between Tata Steel and L&T Infrastructure Development Projects, which has been acquired by Adani Ports. The port began operations in May 2011 and handled a total cargo of 14.3 Mt in 201314. With the acquisition of Dhamra Port, the Group is planning to increase its capacity to over 200 Mt by 2020.

In 2015, the Adani Group's Adani Renewable Energy Park signed a pact with the Rajasthan Government for a 50:50 joint venture to set up India's largest solar park with a capacity of 10,000 MW. In November 2015, the Adani group began construction at the port in Vizhinjam, Kerala.

Adani Aero Defence signed a pact with the Israeli arms manufacturer, Elbit-ISTAR, and Alpha Design Technologies to work in the field of Unmanned Aircraft Systems (UAS) in India in 2016. In April, Adani Enterprises secured approval from the Government of Gujarat to begin work on building a solar power equipment plant. In the same month, the Adani Group inaugurated a 648 MW single-location solar power plant. It was the world's largest solar power plant at the time it was set up.

Total also invested 510 million in a subsidiary of Adani Green Energy in February 2020.

In August 2020, Adani Group obtained a majority stake in Mumbai and Navi Mumbai airports after entering a debt acquisition agreement with GVK Group. Through a concession agreement with the Airports Authority of India, Adani Group also obtained a 50-year lease on Ahmedabad, Guwahati, Jaipur, Lucknow, Mangalore and Thiruvananthapuram airports.

In May 2021, Adani Green Energy acquired SB Energy, a joint venture of SoftBank Group and Bharti Enterprises, for 3.5 billion.

In May 2022, the Adani Group acquired Ambuja Cements and ACC for $10.5 billion. The deal will make the Adani Group the second largest cement maker in India.

In May 2022, UAE-based conglomerate International Holding Company (IHC), headed by Syed Basar Shueb, invested 2 billion in three Adani Group companies, namely Adani Green Energy, Adani Transmission and Adani Enterprises. In June 2022, TotalEnergies acquired a 25% stake in Adani New Industries, the newly formed green hydrogen subsidiary of Adani Enterprises, for 12.5 billion.

Listed companies

Adani Enterprises

Adani Enterprises is a holding company, which is primarily engaged in mining and trading of coal and iron ore on a standalone basis, and acts as an incubator for Adani Group's new business ventures. It has three main subsidiaries: Adani Wilmar (food processing), Adani Airport Holdings (airport operations) and Adani Road Transport (road development). 

Through its other subsidiaries, Adani Enterprises also has business interests in solar PV module manufacturing, water infrastructure, data centers, agri-output storage and distribution, defence and aerospace, bunkering, rail and metro infrastructure, real estate, financial services, oil exploration, petrochemicals and cement.

Adani Green Energy

Adani Green Energy is the renewable energy arm of the group, having wind and solar power plants in its portfolio. It is the world's largest solar power developer by capacity, with a total capacity of 12.3 GW. In 2022, Adani Green formed 3 new subsidiary companies, called Adani Renewable Energy Thirty Six, Adani Renewable Energy Forty Limited and Adani Renewable Energy Forty Seven Limited.

Adani Ports & SEZ

Adani Ports & SEZ (APSEZ) is the largest private port company and special economic zone in India, with ten ports and terminals including Mundra Port, its largest. The company is headed by Karan Adani, CEO of APSEZ. The company's operations include Port management, logistics and the special economic zone. The company operates at the following ports: Mundra, Dahej, and Hazira, Gujarat; Dhamra, Odisha; Kattupalli, Tamil Nadu; and Vizhinjam, Kerala.

Adani Power

Adani Power was established in August 1996. The company develops and maintains power projects and is the largest private sector power generation company in the country. It has a combined installed capacity of 12,450 MW with four thermal power projects across India.

Adani Transmission

Integrated in 2013, Adani Transmission handles the commissioning, operations and maintenance of electric power transmission systems. As of May 2021, the company holds, operates and maintains 17,200 circuit kilometres of transmission lines that range from 400 to 765 kilovolts, making it India's largest private sector power transmission and distribution network.

Adani Total Gas
Adani Total Gas is a city gas distribution company serving both industrial and residential customers in India through piped natural gas connections and compressed natural gas stations. It is a joint venture between Adani Group and the French oil and gas company TotalEnergies. Adani Total Gas has presence in 22 geographical areas (GAs) as a standalone entity as of November 2020.

Indian Oil-Adani Gas Pvt. Ltd., a 50:50 joint venture between Adani Total Gas and Indian Oil Corporation, operates city gas distribution networks in 19 GAs. With a combined presence of 41 GAs in 74 districts, Adani Total Gas is the largest city gas operator in India. Recently, The Adani Group announced strategic collaboration with Snam, Europe's leading gas infrastructure company on energy mix transition.

Adani Wilmar
Adani Wilmar, a joint venture between Adani Enterprises and Wilmar International, is the owner of the Fortune brand of edible oils.

In May 2022, Adani Wilmar Limited (AWL) acquired ‘Kohinoor’ brand from McCormick Switzerland GMBH.

Sports

In addition to its industrial interests, the Adani group owns several sports teams, such as the Gujarat Giants team in the Pro Kabaddi League. In 2022, Adani Group acquired the Gulf Giants team in UAE's International League T20. It also purchased a franchise in Legends League Cricket. In 2023, it purchased a team in the Women's Premier League based in Ahmedabad. 

Teams Owned by Adani Group:

Adani also sponsored various other sports initiatives, including a 2016 nationwide programme to prepare athletes for Rio Olympics called Garv Hai. It was re-launched for a second time to groom athletes for 2020 Tokyo Olympics, 2022 Asian Games and Commonwealth Games. The programme focuses on archery, shooting, athletics, boxing, and wrestling. Beneficiaries of the Garv Hai pilot project in 2016 include Ankita Raina (tennis), Pinki Jangra (boxing), Shiva Thapa (boxing), Khushbir Kaur (athletics), Inderjeet Singh (athletics), Mandeep Jangra (boxing), Malaika Goel (shooting), Deepak Punia (wrestling), KT Irfan (racewalking) and Sanjivani Jadhav (athletics).

Adani Group has naming rights on Hegvold Stadium (now known as Adani Arena) in Rockhampton and the pavilion end of the Narendra Modi Stadium in Ahmedabad.

Covid response
In 2020, the Adani Foundation donated  to the PM CARES Fund to fight the COVID-19 pandemic.

In March 2021, Adani Group announced that it will reimburse the charges incurred by the employees and their families for the COVID-19 vaccination.

In May 2021, Adani Group procured 48 cryogenic tanks from manufacturers in Thailand, Singapore, Saudi Arabia, UAE and Taiwan for transporting medical grade liquid oxygen to combat the second wave of COVID-19 in India.

Controversies

Coal mining in Australia 

The Adani Group launched in 2014, with the support of a part of the Australian Government and Queensland, a mining and rail project (Carmichael coal mine) in Carmichael in Queensland's Galilee Basin for $21.5 billion over the life of the project, i.e. 60 years. This mine is one of many coal mines in Queensland, Australia. Its annual capacity would be 10 Mt of thermal coal.

In response to activist pressure some international banks refused to finance it, and in November 2018, Adani Australia announced that the Carmichael project would be 100% financed by Adani Group resources. In July 2019, the project received its final approvals from the Australian Government and construction of the mine commenced.

The Australian Government has been taken to the Federal Court of Australia by the Australian Conservation Foundation twice, once in 2018 and once in March 2020 (still ongoing ), relating to its contravention and alleged contravention of the Environment Protection and Biodiversity Conservation Act 1999 with respect to the impact of the Carmichael mine on groundwater and the country's water resources.

In 2020, Adani Mining changed its name to Bravus Mining and Resources.

On 29 December 2021, Bravus announced that the first shipment of high-quality coal from the Carmichael mine had been assembled at the North Queensland Export Terminal (NQXT) in Bowen ready for export as planned.

Cronyism 
Chairman and MD Gautam Adani has been described as being close to former Chief Minister of Gujarat and Indian Prime Minister Narendra Modi and his ruling Bharatiya Janata Party (BJP). This has led to allegations of cronyism as his firms have won many Indian energy and infrastructure government contracts. In 2012, an Indian government auditor accused Modi of giving low cost fuel from a Gujarat state-run gas company to the Adani group and other companies. In Jharkhand, the BJP-led state government made an exception to its energy policy for Adani's Godda power plant. Both the Adani Group and Modi's government have denied allegations of cronyism.

The Modi government extended an extraordinary favour to Gautam Adani in order to promote his coal business. Although the Modi government had ascertained that a particular regulation handing over coal blocks to the private sector was ‘inappropriate’ and lacked transparency, the government made an exception. It allowed Adani Enterprises Limited to mine from a block holding more than 450 million tonnes of coal in one of India’s densest forest patches.

Leverage 
In August 2022, CreditSights, a unit of Fitch Ratings, warned that Adani Group was "deeply overleveraged” and that its recent aggressive expansion had hurt the group's cash flow and credit metrics. It also stated that a potential "worst-case scenario" could lead the group to end up in a debt trap and a potential default. However, in September 2022, CreditSights made some corrections in the report and removed the mention of Adani Group being "deeply overleveraged".

Tax evasion 
On 27 February 2010, Central Bureau of Investigation arrested Rajesh Adani, managing director of Adani Enterprises Ltd., on charges of custom duty evasion amounting to ₹80 lakh.

In August 2017, Indian customs alleged the Adani Group was diverting millions of funds from the company's books to Adani family tax havens overseas. Adani was accused of using a Dubai shell company to divert the funds. The details of a $235 million diversion were obtained and published by The Guardian. In 2014, the Directorate of Revenue Intelligence mapped out a complex money trail from India through South Korea and Dubai, and eventually to an offshore company in Mauritius allegedly owned by Vinod Shantilal Adani, the older brother of Gautam Adani.

Stock manipulation and accounting fraud   

In January 2023, Hindenburg Research published the findings of a two-year investigation alleging that Adani had engaged in market manipulation and accounting malpractices. The report accused Adani of pulling "the largest con in corporate history" and "brazen stock manipulation and accounting fraud scheme over the course of decades". Hindenburg also disclosed that it was holding short positions on Adani Group companies. Bonds and shares of companies associated with Adani experienced a decline of more than $104 billion in market value after the accusations, representing approximately half of the market value. Hedge fund manager Bill Ackman said Hindenburg's Adani Report was "highly credible and extremely well researched." Adani denied the fraud allegations as without merit. 

On 29 January, Adani released a 413 page response to the Hindenburg report, calling Hindenburg’s conduct a "calculated securities fraud" and the report a "calculated attack on India, the independence, integrity and quality of Indian institutions, and the growth story and ambition of India." Hindenburg characterized the response as failing to engage with the issues raised by its initial report, and an exercise in obfuscation under the garb of nationalism. On 1 February, Adani cancelled its planned $2.5 billion (Rs 20,000 crore) Follow-on Public Offer (FPO) citing market volatility, and announced that it would return the FPO money to investors. Reserve Bank of India sought details from banks on exposure to Adani firms. Citigroup's wealth unit stopped extending margin loans to its clients against securities of Adani Group. Credit Suisse Group AG stopped accepting bonds of Adani Group companies as collateral for margin loans to its private banking clients. S&P Dow Jones Indices removed Adani Enterprises from its sustainability index.

Norway's Oil Fund, which had already shed a bulk of its Adani shares pre-Hindenburg report, divested its entire stake following the report.

On 23 February 2023, the Adani Group said it is exploring legal options to take "punitive action" against Hindenburg Research for its findings. However, a Hindenburg statement asserted that it stands by its report that alleged "brazen" market manipulation and accounting fraud by the Adani Group.

A group of truckers transporting cement from Adani’s factories in Himachal Pradesh has celebrated the Hindenburg report. The truckers assert that the critical research report on Adani Group was a godsend that helped them save their livelihoods. Around 7,000 truck owners and drivers in Himachal Pradesh were protesting against Adani’s decision to shut two cement plants over a dispute on freight rates.  The report "played a crucial role in our battle against the India’s biggest business group, helped mobilize truckers and gain political support," said Ram Krishan Sharma, one of the lead negotiators for protesting truckers.

A report of 2 March 2023 reveals that an entity related to the Adani Group financially supported a company that violated sanctions imposed by the United Nations Security Council (UNSC) on trade with North Korea. The sanctioned company was owned by sons of Chang Chung-Ling, an Adani Group associate who appeared in the Hindenburg report because of his directorship of Adani entities.

Investigation 
On 13 February 2023, India's markets regulator - the Securities and Exchange Board of India (SEBI) - confirmed that it is investigating allegations made by Hindenburg Research against companies owned by Gautam Adani.

On 2 March 2023, the Supreme Court of India formed a six-member committee which is supposed to examine issues related to the Adani Group's stock crash after the Hindenburg report.

Manipulating Wikipedia entries 
A February 2023 article in The Signpost said that the Adani team has been manipulating Wikipedia entries using sock puppet accounts to insert promotional material and remove or edit criticism.

References

External links
   
 Hindenburg Report on Adani Group 
 Adani Response to Hindenburg 

 
Companies based in Ahmedabad
Corporate crime
Corporate scandals
Indian companies established in 1988
1988 establishments in Gujarat
Adani family
Scandals in India 
Real estate companies of India
Companies listed on the National Stock Exchange of India